Uropterygius marmoratus is a moray eel found in coral reefs in the Pacific and Indian Oceans. It is commonly known as the marbled reef-eel, marbled eel, marbled snake moray, marbled moray, or the slender conger eel.

References

marmoratus
Fish described in 1803